Barbara Shapiro, or B.A., or Xixi Shapiro, is an American author. Her initial works were published as Barbara Shapiro; her recent novels are styled as authored by B.A. Shapiro.

Works
She has written novels, screenplays, and a non-fiction self-help book.

Novels
 The Muralist
 The Art Forger The book is based on the unsolved Isabella Stewart Gardner Museum theft of thirteen works of art.
 The Safe Room
 Blind Spot
 See No Evil
 Blameless
 Shattered Echoes  
 The Collector's Apprentice
 Metropolis

Screenplays
 Blind Spot
 The Lost Coven
 Borderline
 Shattered Echoes

Non-fiction book
 The Big Squeeze: Balancing the Needs of Aging Parents, Dependent Children, and You (1991)

Awards
Shapiro received the 2013 New England Book Award for Fiction, a 2013 Massachusetts Must-Read Book award, and a 2012 Boston Globe Best Crime Book award. She was nominated for a 2013 Massachusetts Book Award.

References

External links
Author website

21st-century American novelists
Living people
Novelists from Massachusetts
American women novelists
Screenwriters from Massachusetts
21st-century American women writers
Year of birth missing (living people)
21st-century American screenwriters